Shanghai fried noodles is a dish made from Shanghai-style noodles, which can be found in most Chinese food markets. The more commonly known Japanese udon can be used as a substitute. The noodles are typically stir-fried with beef cutlets, bok choy, and onion, or with pork and Chinese yellow chives. The dish is a staple of Shanghai cuisine, and is usually served at dumpling houses. In recent years Shanghai fried noodles have become known to western chefs, including celebrity chef Emeril Lagasse.

See also
 Fried noodles
 List of noodles
 List of noodle dishes

References

Shanghai cuisine
Chinese noodle dishes
Fried noodles